Crambidia dusca is a moth of the family Erebidae. It was described by William Barnes and James Halliday McDunnough in 1913. It is found in North America, where it has been recorded from California and Ontario.

The wingspan is about 27 mm.

References

Lithosiina
Moths described in 1913